William Henry Huddle  (1847–1892) was an American painter famous for his portrait of Davy Crockett that hangs in the Texas State Capitol and his depiction of the surrender of Antonio López de Santa Anna. The Texas State Legislature commissioned Huddle to paint official portraits of the state's chief executives.

Biography
He was born to Stephen G. and Nancy Foster Huddle on February 12, 1847 in Wytheville, Virginia. Huddle served in the Confederate States Army before moving to Texas with his family. He received his artistic training at the National Academy of Design  in New York, New York and also in Munich, Germany. He married sculptor and artist Nannie Carver in 1889, and they had a daughter. He died March 23, 1892, and is buried in Oakwood Cemetery in Austin. Nannie died in 1951 and is buried next to him.

Gallery

References

External links
 Marble Falls by William Henry Huddle Dallas Museum of Art

1847 births
1892 deaths
National Academy of Design alumni
Burials at Oakwood Cemetery (Austin, Texas)
19th-century American painters
American male painters
Painters from Texas
Davy Crockett
People from Wytheville, Virginia
Painters from Virginia
People of Virginia in the American Civil War